The Sumathi Best Teledrama Child Actor Award is presented annually in Sri Lanka by the Sumathi Group to the best Sri Lankan child actor in television.

The award was first given in 2014 with the collaboration of Anchor. Following is a list of the winners of this title.

References

Child Actor
Awards for young actors
Awards established in 2014
2014 establishments in Sri Lanka